"If Leaving Me Is Easy" is a song by Phil Collins from his 1981 album Face Value. Released as the third single from the album, it reached No. 17 in the UK, but was not released as a single in the United States. Collins sings in a high falsetto in its chorus. The song was later covered by The Isley Brothers for their 1985 album Masterpiece.

Involvement of Eric Clapton
This was the first of two Phil Collins singles that featured Eric Clapton. The other single was "I Wish It Would Rain Down" from Collins' final album of the 1980s, ...But Seriously. He also recorded some dobro for "The Roof Is Leaking", which was not used on the final recording.

Live versions
Collins revealed on the "Making of Face Value" episode of Classic Albums that he decided to stop performing this song live on stage following his 1985 No Jacket Required tour because he disliked the audience yelling and screaming instead of being quiet while he performed this song. According to SongFacts.com, Collins performed the song on the BBC music show Top of the Pops with a bucket of paint and paintbrush on top of his electric piano, a reference to his first wife's affair with a painter and decorator.

Charts

Personnel
Phil Collins: Rhodes, drums, vocals, Prophet 5
Eric Clapton: guitar
Daryl Stuermer: guitar
Alphonso Johnson: bass guitar
Don Myrick: alto sax
Rahmlee Michael Davis and Michael Harris: flugelhorns
Strings arranged by Arif Mardin
 Gavin Cochrane: Photography

References

1981 singles
Phil Collins songs
Rock ballads
Rhythm and blues ballads
Songs written by Phil Collins
Virgin Records singles
Song recordings produced by Phil Collins
1980 songs
Song recordings produced by Hugh Padgham